Tørris Johnsen Worum (1784 – 4 May 1834) was a Norwegian politician.

He worked as a farmer in Nord-Trøndelag. He was elected to the Norwegian Parliament in 1824, representing the constituency of Nordre Throndhjems Amt (now Nord-Trøndelag).  He served only one term. His son Johannes Tørrissen Worum (1817-1889) later served in the Norwegian Parliament from the same district.

References

1784 births
1834 deaths
Members of the Storting
Politicians from Nord-Trøndelag